The Apiomerini are a tribe of the Harpactorinae (assassin bugs). This tribe is restricted to the New World and consists of 11 genera.

Partial list of genera

Agriocleptus Stål, 1866
Agriocoris Stål, 1866
Amauroclopius Stål, 1868
Apiomerus Hahn, 1831
Beharus Fabricius, 1803
Heniartes Spinola, 1840
Manicocoris Fabricius, 1787
Micrauchenus Amyot & Servile, 1843
Ponerobia Amyot & Serville, 1843

References

Reduviidae
Hemiptera tribes